Erigone dentigera is a species of dwarf spider in the family Linyphiidae. It is found in North America, Europe, Caucasus, and Russia (Far East).

References

Linyphiidae
Articles created by Qbugbot
Spiders described in 1874